Rajanpur ,  is a city and the headquarters of Rajanpur District in the far southwestern part of Punjab, Pakistan. Most of its inhabitants are Saraikis and Baloch.

History

Rajanpur was founded in 1732-33 by Makhdoom Sheikh Rajan Shah, from whom the city's name derives. Sheikh Rajan established Rajanpur in an area that he had captured from Nahar tribesmen. The settlement remained a largely unimportant village until flooding in 1862 severely damaged the nearby district headquarters at Mithankot - leading to the transfer of government offices to Rajanpur. A small dispensary clinic was established in Rajanpur that same year. Rajanpur was then constituted as a municipality in 1873.

References

Populated places in Rajanpur District